Daniel Charles Collins (22 August 1872 – 6 July 1925) was an Australian rules footballer who played with St Kilda in the Victorian Football League (VFL), and who served in South Africa during the Second Boer War.

Football (pre-Boer War)

Victorian Artillery
Collins joined the Victorian Artillery stationed at Fort Queenscliff, Victoria, and was captain of their football team in 1891, and 1892.

Richmond (VFA)
He also played three matches for Richmond in the Victorian Football Association (VFA) in 1891

St Kilda (VFA & VFL)
He also played for St Kilda in the VFA from 1892 to 1896; and in the first two years of the Victorian Football League (VFL) competition (1897 and 1898).

Police Force
Collins served in the Victorian police force; and, later, in the New South Wales police force.

Military service
Collins served in South Africa with the First Battalion Australian Commonwealth Horse in the Second Boer War. A policeman, Collins, enlisted on 25 January 1902 as a trooper, and was promoted to Lance-Corporal on 8 July 1902.

Murray (1911, p. 166) notes that, "only single men were taken", and that "the men selected were required to be good shots and good horsemen; men of previous service having preference, if medically fit". The contingent left Sydney on 18 February 1902, on the troopship Custodian, disembarking at Durban on 19 March 1902, and returned to Australia on the controversially disease-ridden and seriously overcrowded troopship Drayton Grange, leaving Durban on 11 July 1902, and arriving at Sydney on 11 August 1902.

Football (post-Boer War)

East Sydney (NSWAFA)
Following his military service in South Africa, he played with the  East Sydney Australian Football Club in the New South Wales Australian Football Association (NSWAFA); and was its first captain in 1903.

In 1903 he played in a representative "Metropolitan" combined team, against a combined "Northern District League" team. He kicked two goals for the East Sydney team that defeated 
North Shore 6.8 (44) to 4.2. (26)  to win the competition's inaugural premiership in 1903.

He continued to play for East Sydney until, at least, 1908.

Pony Trainer
Having left the police force, and having spent eighteen months conducting the Temple Bar Hotel at 312 George Street, Sydney, he sold his interest in the hotel, and turned his attention to pony training, at which he was highly respected and, ultimately, very successful.

Death
Having had an operation two years earlier that had required the amputation of his leg, he died at his residence, "Sellbrook" — at 221 Anzac Parade, named after his favourite horse, Sellbrook — in the Sydney suburb of Kensington on 6 July 1925.

Footnotes

References 
 Boer War Dossier: Trooper Daniel Charles Collins (247), National Archives of Australia.NOTE: Due to Collin's unusual calligraphy, a bureaucrat mis-read the numerous (identical) handwritten entries of "Daniel Charles Collins" as if they were "David Charles Collins"; and, as a consequence, the item has been incorrectly catalogued as "David Charles Collins".
 Pre First World War Conflicts Nominal Rolls: Trooper Daniel Collins (247), Australian War Memorial.  
 (PLM) Murray, P.L., "New South Wales, First Battalion Australian Commonwealth Horse: Nominal Roll, "B" Squadron, Official Records of the Australian Military Contingents to the War in South Africa, (Melbourne), Albert J. Mullett, Government Printer, 1911, p.171.
 Holmesby, Russell & Main, Jim (2014). The Encyclopedia of AFL Footballers: every AFL/VFL player since 1897 (10th ed.), (Melbourne), Bas Publishing. 
 Murray, P.L., Official Records of the Australian Military Contingents to the War in South Africa, (Melbourne), Albert J. Mullett, Government Printer, 1911.
 Peake, W., Sydney's Pony Racecourses: An Alternative Racing History, (Petersham), Walla Walla Press, 2006.

External links 

1872 births
1925 deaths
Australian rules footballers from Victoria (Australia)
St Kilda Football Club players
Richmond Football Club (VFA) players
Australian military personnel of the Second Boer War
Australian Army soldiers
Australian amputees